Drudwas ap Tryffin is a knight of King Arthur's court in early Arthurian mythology and the owner of the magical Adar Llwch Gwin. His father, Tryffin, is described as the king of Denmark, while his sister, Erdudwyl, was, according to The Death of Drudwas, supposedly a “mistress” of Arthur.

Role in Welsh tradition

Drudwas appears very briefly in the early Welsh tale Culhwch and Olwen, in which he is part of the long court list of Arthur's men. His sister Erdudwyl appears as one of the golden-torqued women of Arthur's court, and goes on to play a pivotal role in Drudwas' demise. The Trioedd y Meirch refer to Drudwas as the owner of one of the three bestowed horses of the isle of Britain
, while a later triad names him as one of the Golden-tongued knights of Arthur's court, alongside Eliwlod ap Madoc and Gwalchmai. The triad goes on to say: "there was neither king nor lord to whom those came who did not listen to them; and whatever quest they sought, they wished for and obtained it, either willingly or unwillingly."

His most prominent role is in the tale The Death of Drudwas recorded in a 17th-century manuscript tells of his enmity with Arthur:

The legend goes on to say that Llywarch Hen, an historical 6th century British prince, composed a song following Drudwas' death:

References

Welsh mythology
Arthurian characters